Alison Lee (born 24 December 1994) is an indoor and field hockey player from Canada.

Personal life
Alison Lee was born and raised in Mississauga, Ontario.

Career

Indoor
In 2013, Alison Lee made her debut for the Canada Indoor team, during a test series against the United States in Feasterville.

Throughout her indoor career Lee has medalled with the team once, winning gold at the 2014 Indoor Pan American Cup in Montevideo. Since then, she has gone on to become captain of the team.

Field hockey
As well as indoor hockey, Lee also plays field hockey for the Canadian national team. She debuted in 2017, and has gone on to represent the team in several tournaments since.

Her most notable inclusion in the national team was at the 2018 Commonwealth Games held on the Gold Coast.

References

External links
 
 

1994 births
Living people
Canadian female field hockey players
Female field hockey defenders
Field hockey people from Ontario
Sportspeople from Mississauga
2023 FIH Indoor Hockey World Cup players